The Minister of Foreign Affairs (Pororashtrya Montri; or simply the Foreign Minister) is the head of the Ministry of Foreign Affairs of the Government of the People's Republic of Bangladesh.

List of foreign ministers

See also 
 Constitution of Bangladesh
 President of Bangladesh
 Prime Minister of Bangladesh
 Politics of Bangladesh

References 
 http://www.mofa.gov.bd/index.php?option=com_content&task=view&id=496&Itemid=517

 
Politics of Bangladesh
Government of Bangladesh

Government ministers of Bangladesh
Lists of ministers by ministry of Bangladesh